Petur Knudsen (born 21 April 1998) is a Faroese professional footballer who plays as a forward for the Danish Superliga club Lyngby Boldklub and the Faroe Islands national team.

Club career
On 30 June 2021, Knudsen signed a two-year deal with newly relegated Danish 1st Division club Lyngby Boldklub. He won promotion to the Danish Superliga in his first season with the club, making 26 total appearances in which he scored eight goals.

International career
Knudsen made his international debut for Faroe Islands on 28 March 2021 in a 2022 FIFA World Cup qualification match against Austria, which finished as a 3–1 away loss.

Personal life
Knudsen is the son of former Faroese international footballer Jens Martin Knudsen.

Career statistics

Club

International

Honours
NSÍ
 Faroe Islands Cup: 2017

Individual
 Faroese Footballer of the Year: 2020
 Faroese Young Footballer of the Year: 2020

References

External links
 Petur Knudsen at FaroeSoccer.com 
 

1998 births
Living people
People from Saltangará
Faroese footballers
Faroese expatriate footballers
Faroe Islands youth international footballers
Faroe Islands under-21 international footballers
Faroe Islands international footballers
Association football forwards
NSÍ Runavík players
Lyngby Boldklub players
Faroe Islands Premier League players
1. deild players
Danish 1st Division players
Expatriate men's footballers in Denmark